Nascio is a genus of beetles in the family Buprestidae, containing the following species:

 Nascio chydaea Olliff, 1886
 Nascio simillima van de Poll, 1886
 Nascio vetusta (Boisduval, 1835)
 Nascio xanthura (Gory & Laporte, 1839)

References

Buprestidae genera